3 Bahadur: The Revenge of Baba Balaam is a Pakistani 3D computer-animated family film directed by Sharmeen Obaid-Chinoy. It is the second installment in the franchise 3 Bahadur.

Cast
 Zuhab Khan as Saadi
 Fahim Khan as Baba Balaam
 Shahzaib Khan as Kamil
 Arisha Razi as Amna
 Behroze Sabzwari as Deenu
 Ahmed Ali Butt as Gola
 Ali Gul Pir as Teeli/Lolly
 Fahad Mustafa as Imran
 Mustafa Changazi as Tony
 Sarwat Gilani as Saadi's mother
 Zeba Shehnaz as Parrot
 Bassam Shazli as Pateeli/Chatpa
 Hammad Siddiq as Ghutka/ Shikra
 Joel Frenzer as Gabru

Production

Marketing
The sequel of 3 Bahadur was announced in a press release in November 2015. The details revealed that Fahad Mustafa, Ahmed Ali Butt, Salman Shahid and Sarwat Gilani will also lend their voices in the sequel titled 3 Bahadur: The Revenge of Baba Balaam. In March 2016, ARY Films unveiled the first look poster through a tweet.

Release
The teaser for the film was released on YouTube on 3 August 2016. Later the official Trailer for the film was released online on 27 October 2016. The film was released on 15 December 2016.

Reception

Box office
The movie opened better on Thursday with day one collecting  in its opening week.

Sequel

The third film, 3 Bahadur: Rise of the Warriors is scheduled to be released in December 2018, which has the voice by Mehwish Hayat, Fahad Mustafa, Sarwat Gillani, Nimra Bucha and Behroze Sabzwari.

See also
List of Pakistani films of 2016
List of Pakistani animated films

References

External links

2016 films
2016 3D films
2016 computer-animated films
2010s adventure films
2010s children's adventure films
Films directed by Sharmeen Obaid-Chinoy
Pakistani adventure films
Pakistani animated films
Pakistani children's films
Pakistani 3D films
3D animated films
Pakistani sequel films